Code page 720 (CCSID 720) (also known as CP 720, IBM 00720, and OEM 720) is a code page used under DOS to write Arabic in Egypt, Iraq, Jordan, Saudi Arabia, and Syria. The Windows (ANSI) code page for Arabic is Windows-1256.

Character set
Each character is shown with its equivalent Unicode code point. Only the second half of the table (code points 128–255) is shown, the first half (code points 0–127) being the same as code page 437.

References

720